Vincenzo Renato Rennella (born 8 October 1988) is a French-born Italian professional footballer who plays as a forward for Greek club Xanthi.

Club career
Renella was born in Saint-Paul-de-Vence, and made his senior debuts with AS Cannes in 2006. In 2008, after a season at FC Lugano, he was bought by Genoa C.F.C., being loaned back to Lugano in a season-long deal.

After scoring 24 goals in 22 matches, Rennella was loaned to Grasshoppers on 16 July 2009. After two years at the club he joined A.C. Cesena, also in a temporary deal.

Rennella made his Serie A debut on 30 October 2011, starting in a 0–2 away loss against Parma F.C. He scored his first goal in the category on 20 April of the following year, netting his team's last in a 2–2 home draw against U.S. Città di Palermo.

On 30 August 2012, Rennella moved to Córdoba CF, in a one-year loan deal. After scoring seven goals for the Andalusians, he signed a four-year contract with Real Betis, being immediately loaned to CD Lugo.

Back to Betis for 2014–15, Rennella contributed with six goals in 34 appearances, as his side returned to La Liga at first attempt. He made his debut in the category on 23 August 2015, coming on as a late substitute for Jorge Molina in a 1–1 home draw against Villarreal CF.

On 14 January 2016, Rennella moved to Segunda División side Real Valladolid, on loan until June and with an obligatory permanent deal at the expiration of his loan. On 4 August, he was loaned to Miami FC of the NASL until December 2017, now owned by Valladolid.

On 23 July 2018, Rennella returned to Spain and its second division, after signing for Extremadura UD. His contract was terminated the following 30 January, after 12 goalless appearances, and he moved to fellow league team Cádiz CF on 10 February.

Career statistics
.

Honours
Betis
Segunda División: 2014–15

References

External links

SoFoot profile 

1988 births
Living people
French footballers
Italian footballers
Association football forwards
AS Cannes players
Swiss Super League players
Swiss Challenge League players
FC Lugano players
Grasshopper Club Zürich players
Serie A players
Genoa C.F.C. players
A.C. Cesena players
La Liga players
Segunda División players
Córdoba CF players
Real Betis players
CD Lugo players
Real Valladolid players
Extremadura UD footballers
Cádiz CF players
North American Soccer League players
Miami FC players
French expatriate footballers
Italian expatriate footballers
Expatriate footballers in Switzerland
French expatriate sportspeople in Switzerland
Italian expatriate sportspeople in Switzerland
Expatriate footballers in Spain
French expatriate sportspeople in Spain
Italian expatriate sportspeople in Spain